The 291st Engineer Combat Battalion  was one of the most decorated engineer combat battalions of the United States Army during World War II, playing notable roles both in the  Battle of Bulge and the Rhine river crossing at Remagen.

Commanded by Colonel David E. Pergrin, it earned a Presidential Citation for its performance in the Ardennes, blowing up bridges and fighting as infantry in helping stunt the German advance towards Antwerp. Scouting parties of 291st discovered 17 survivors of the Malmedy massacre on 17 December 1944. After nearly a month of grueling counter measures against the initial Panzer forces led by Joachim Peiper, the battalion's C Company returned to Malmedy to discover the bodies of 86 murdered US GIs frozen under a thick blanket of snow on 14 January 1945.

The battalion led the construction of  the first pontoon bridge across the Rhine at Remagen to take traffic pressure off the severely damaged Ludendorff Bridge before its tragic collapse. The span made a material contribution in facilitating the U.S. Army's drive into central Germany.

From an initial force of roughly 600 men trained at Camp Swift, there were 93 wounded and 8 killed in action by war's end.
During its tour of Europe, the 291st had constructed 23 timber bridges, 44 Bailey bridges, 7 treadway bridges, constructed 11 bridges under fire, destroyed 6 bridges, made 7 river assault crossings, deactivated 15 bombs, cleared 7000 mines, and taken 8500 German prisoners.

Capabilities

As a combat engineer battalion the 291st was capable of providing combat support essential to sustaining operating forces in the theater of war.  These spanned such diverse activities as construction, demolition, sanitation, map production, minefield clearing, and unit intelligence.

Combat engineer battalions also fielded defensive .30 cal. and .50 cal. machine gun squads, anti-tank rocket and grenade launchers, and were required to fight as infantry when needed.

The range of services provided included but was not limited to: 
Bridge (mobile, floating, fixed), rail, & road construction and maintenance
Conducting river crossings by ponton/raft, motor-powered assault boats
Demolition
Placing/de-arming munitions, including mines
Port & harbor maintenance and rehabilitation, including beachheads:
Laying roads and unloading/loading supplies, vehicles & personnel from transport and cargo ships
Camouflage 
Water supply and sanitation
Map production
Vehicle maintenance
Establishing/maintaining supply and ammunition dumps
Building barracks, depots, and similar structures
Rescue & road patrols, bridge and road reconnaissance
Clearing of debris and wreckage
Serving as infantry when needed

These included the deployment and operation of assault boats and the construction of various pontoon bridges, including M1 treadways, and modular steel truss Bailey bridges.

Presidential Citation
The 291st received a Presidential Citation for its "outstanding performance of duty in action" for holding a defensive position against a German offensive from 17 December to 26 December in the Ardennes during the Battle of the Bulge:

As authorized by Executive Order No. 9396 (sec. I, Bul. 22, WD, 1943),
superseding Executive Order No. 9075 (sec. III, Bul. 11, WD, 1942), citation of
the following unit in General Orders, No. 30. Headquarters First United States
Army, 18 February 1945, as approved by the Commanding General, European
Theater of Operations, is confirmed under the provisions of section IV, Circular
No. 333, War Department, 1943, in the name of the President, of the United States
as public evidence of deserved honor and distinction. The citation reads as
follows:

The 291st Engineer Combat Battalion is cited for outstanding performance of
duty in action against the enemy from 17 to 26 December 1944, in Belgium. On
17 December 1944, at the beginning of the German Ardennes break-through, the
291st Engineer Combat Battalion was assigned the mission of establishing and
manning roadblocks south and east of Malmedy, and with the defense of the
town itself. The battalion set up essential roadblocks and prepared hasty defenses.
Shortly thereafter, numerically superior enemy infantry and armored columns
moving in the direction of Malmedy were engaged. Though greatly outnumbered
and constantly subjected to heavy enemy artillery, mortar, and small-arms fire, the
officers and men of the 291st Engineer Combat Battalion stubbornly resisted all
enemy attempts to drive through their positions. Repeated attacks were made by
enemy armor and infantry on roadblocks and defensive positions and, in each
instance, were thrown back with heavy losses by the resolute and determined
resistance. The determination, devotion to duty, and unyielding fighting spirit
displayed by the personnel of the 291st Engineer Combat Battalion, in delaying and
containing a powerful enemy force along a route of vital importance to the Allied 
effort, are worthy of high praise.

Images

See also

References

Further reading 
 The Battle of the Bulge
 Engineers in World War II
 Bob Cresswell and the Engineers vs Peiper's Panzers (video: Bridge demolition evokes "Damned Engineers" moniker.)
 Bernie Goldstein Halts a Column of 90 Panzers (video: A lone private delays Pieper prior to the Battle of the Bulge.)
 Discovering a Whole Field of Dead Americans (video: Soldiers Herd and Hensel recount the grim discovery of the Malmedy Massacre.)
 Pegrin, David E., First Across the Rhine: The 291st Engineer Combat Battalion in France, Belgium, and Germany
 Janice Holt Giles 

Engineer battalions of the United States Army
Battalions of the United States Army in World War II
Battle of the Bulge
World War II massacres
Military units and formations established in 1943